Xingan County (formerly ) is a county in the central part of Jiangxi province, People's Republic of China.

History 
Xingan County was set up in year 221 BCE. It is one of the 18 ancient counties in Jiangxi province.

Administration 
Xingan has jurisdiction over 6 towns, 7 townships and 2 state-run farm or forestry areas. The seat of the county locates at the Jinchuan Town.
6 towns

7 townships

Demographics 

Climate

Places of interests 
 Dayangzhou site

References 

County-level divisions of Jiangxi